The Man Who Never Was is a two-part episode and the story finale of The Sarah Jane Adventures which was broadcast on CBBC on 17 and 18 October 2011. It is the third and final story of the fifth series, and the final appearance of all the main cast, including the final appearance of Elisabeth Sladen as Sarah Jane Smith following the actress' death from cancer earlier that year.

Plot

Part 1
A woman who works as a cleaner at Serf Systems watches the commercial for the new SerfBoard. She suddenly hears an odd noise coming from a lift. When she arrives there, the lift opens and a mysterious figure snatches her.

Luke returns home from university and he meets Sky for the first time. Sarah Jane, Clyde and Rani are glad to see him. Luke realises that his old room is now Sky's, and when he mentions that fact, Sky feels guilty. Luke explains that, while he has a dog whistle to call K9, the robot dog currently cannot leave Oxford. As Mr Smith expresses his delight, Rani jokes that they could replace Mr Smith with the new SerfBoard. Sarah Jane reveals that she has been chosen to see a run through of the speech that Joseph Serf (the creator of the SerfBoard) will present. She takes Luke and Sky with her to the run through and bumps into Lionel Carson, her old editor, who mentions his dislike of computers. As the run through gets underway and Joseph Serf is giving his speech, Luke and Sky notice Serf's face suddenly glitch. Once Sarah Jane and Lionel have received a SerfBoard, Lionel takes a great liking to the device, and Luke and Sky tell Sarah Jane what they saw.

Sarah Jane and Sky return home while Luke stays to see if there are any more glitches. Mr Smith displays video of the speech and confirms that Serf's face glitched. As they review Serf's past, they discover that he disappeared after a serious skiing accident. This leads Sarah Jane to conclude that the real Joseph Serf died in the skiing accident and the one at the run through was a hologram. She sets up an interview with Serf, using cryptic wording which suggests to Public Relations head John Harrison she knows that Serf is a hologram. 

As Sarah Jane, Luke, and Sky go to meet Serf, Clyde and Rani have Mr Smith scan the SerfBoard to uncover anything alien about it. They discover that it is just a cheap, poor quality laptop computer. Harrison is adamant on staying with Serf and Sarah Jane during the interview. While Sarah Jane conducts the interview, Luke and Sky go into the basement and discover that aliens are controlling the Serf image. When the aliens have trouble keeping up, Serf's language becomes garbled and his facial expressions inappropriate. Unaffected by the image's "hypno power", Sarah Jane wafts her arms through the hologram. Harrison points an alien weapon at her. At the same time, the aliens notice Luke and Sky and surround them.

Part 2
The aliens, called Skullions, warn Luke and Sky to flee. To buy time for Sarah Jane's escape, Sky pulls a lever in the control room, causing the Serf hologram to malfunction. Harrison pulls out his pen and presses a button,  torturing the Skullions via collars on their necks. Sarah Jane, Luke, and Sky are all captured, and Harrison reveals that he bought the enslaved Skullions on the black market after their ship crashed in China. Though the SerfBoard is nothing special, the Serf hologram has a hypnotic setting that can make people - especially the audience of the upcoming launch, both live and televised - want to buy the product. Harrison gloats over the fortune he will make from the SerfBoard's success. He then separates Sarah Jane from the teenagers, placing her in a locked room with the cleaner, Adriana, who expresses empathy for "the little people". She explains how the Skullion who grabbed her earlier was punished by the guards before she was thrown into the room.

Locked in another room, Luke and Sky discuss whether Luke misses his old room. Plark, a Skullion, comes in to give them food and water. Luke offers him some water, but he refuses and explains the Skullions can only drink citrus juices. Although Luke is too far from K9 to contact him with the dog whistle, he is able to contact Mr Smith in Morse code, telling Clyde and Rani to grab Harrison's pen. After receiving Luke's message, Clyde and Rani assume the identities of Trevor and Janet Sharp, married journalists actually stranded at an airport due to a computer malfunction engineered by Mr Smith, and head for the launch. 

Adriana and Sarah Jane work together to escape, locking the guard behind them. They then free Luke and Sky. Before the broadcast of the SerfBoard launch, Harrison threatens the Skullions with death should they make a mistake during the launch. To emphasise his "message", he sprays the Skullions, with water, which burns their skin. At the launch, Clyde manages to switch pens with Harrison without his initially noticing it, but as the launch begins Harrison forcibly takes the pen back from Rani. 

Sarah Jane has Mr Smith contact a rescue vehicle from the Skullions' home planet, and the Skullions run up to the roof to meet it. In the control room, Luke and Sky control the hologram, making Serf act bizarrely.  When Harrison uses the pen to inflict maximum punishment on the Skullions, Luke and Sky use the hologram's hypnotic power to compel the audience to grab the pen and smash it. After Lionel smashes the pen underfoot, Serf tells the audience the SerfBoard is rubbish and they should tell everyone. The Serf hologram then tells Clyde and Rani to go to the roof, and Harrison follows. On the roof, the rescue spaceship arrives. As the Skullions head for the transport beam, Harrison runs after them and grabs Plark, resulting in the ship beaming both of them up. Sarah Jane gives Adriana, who now has no job, a UNIT business card and a recommendation that UNIT could use someone like her.

Back home, Luke finally accepts Sky as his sister and that his old room is now hers, as she walks in on him hanging up a picture drawn by Clyde, entitled "Sky's Room". As a final montage of her past adventures in the series (and a couple of episodes of Doctor Who) play, Sarah Jane voices over: 
The episode closes over an image of Earth with the on-screen text, "And the story goes on... forever."

Continuity
 Sarah Jane's final speech at the conclusion of this story is an amalgamation of used and unused takes of Elisabeth Sladen's closing voiceover from the Series 1 finale The Lost Boy.
 A sequence of past clips from the series was played. Among them included a footage of Sarah Jane hugging The Doctor in "Journey's End" and a clip from "The End of Time", both from the Doctor Who series.

Farewell, Sarah Jane
Although not an official episode of The Sarah Jane Adventures, on 19 April 2020 a special 13-minute webcast mini episode entitled "Farewell, Sarah Jane" aired on Doctor Who's social media channels as a tribute to Elisabeth Sladen, and also so that fans of the series would receive some closure, since the series had ended abruptly due to Sladen's sudden death in 2011.

References

External links

"Farewell, Sarah Jane" at YouTube

2011 British television episodes
The Sarah Jane Adventures episodes
British television series finales